The Firtuşu gas field is a natural gas field located in Lupeni, Harghita County, Romania. It was discovered in 1966 and developed by Romgaz. It began production in 1970 and produces natural gas and condensates. The total proven reserves of the Firtuşu gas field are around 100 billion cubic feet (2.8 km³), and production is centered on 30 million cubic feet/day (0.85×105m³).

References

Natural gas fields in Romania